Barbara Paulus (born 1 September 1970) is a former professional top-ten tennis player from Austria. She began playing on the WTA Tour in 1986 and retired in 2001. During her career, she won a total of seven WTA tournaments (six singles titles, one doubles title). Paulus competed for the Austria Fed Cup team on 21 occasions in singles and doubles, winning nine of her 22 matches.

Career
Paulus is one of the most successful Austrian female tennis players, being one of only two to be ranked in the top 10 (along with Barbara Schett), despite having a career plagued with injuries. She won six singles titles and one doubles title on the WTA Tour. Her best results include victories over Chris Evert, Mary Pierce, Gabriela Sabatini, Conchita Martínez, and Jana Novotná.

After reaching as high as No. 12 in the world in 1990, she sustained injuries to her knee and both wrists which required her to have surgery and kept her sidelined for many months through 1992 and 1993. Her comeback from injury eventually bore her much success, with four WTA titles between 1995 and 1997, a top-ten ranking, and reaching her biggest career final at the Tier I Family Circle Cup, where she lost in three sets to Arantxa Sánchez Vicario.

Her career effectively ended in 1998 after an elbow injury, though she made a brief return in 2001.

Awards
 1990: Golden Needle Award from Austrian Tennis Federation

WTA career finals

Singles: 17 (6–11)

Doubles: 1 (1–0)

ITF finals

Singles (2–3)

Doubles (0–2)

References

External links
 
 
 
 
 

1970 births
Living people
Austrian female tennis players
Hopman Cup competitors
Olympic tennis players of Austria
People from Mödling District
Tennis players from Vienna
Tennis players at the 1988 Summer Olympics
Tennis players at the 1992 Summer Olympics
Sportspeople from Lower Austria